Here is the list of Our lady of Presentation Churches around the world.

Asia

India
 Our Lady of Presentation Church, Mathapuram, Tamilnadu

Srilanka
 Church of Our Lady of Presentation, Batticaloa, Maṭṭakkaḷappu, Eastern Province

South America

Brazil
 Our Lady of the Presentation Cathedral, Natal, Rio Grande do Norte

External links
Site of the Archdiocese of Natal 
Site about Our Lady of Presentation 
Letter of the Anthem of Our Lady of Presentation in the Portuguese Wikisource 

Catholic Church in Brazil
Statues of the Virgin Mary
Shrines to the Virgin Mary
Titles of Mary
Rio Grande do Norte